Carrasco/General Cesáreo L. Berisso International Airport  is the main international airport of Uruguay.  It is the country's largest airport and is located in the Carrasco neighborhood of Montevideo. It has been cited as one of the most efficient and traveler-friendly airports in Latin America.

The airport is named after Cesáreo L. Berisso, a pioneer of Uruguayan aviation, and it also hosts an air base of the Uruguayan Air Force.

History
The original passenger terminal was inaugurated in 1947. In 2003 the Uruguayan government transferred the administration, operation and maintenance of the airport to the private investment group Puerta del Sur S.A, which since then invested in several upgrades of the airport.

On 3 February 2007, construction began on a new terminal parallel to Runway 06/24. The new terminal, designed by Uruguayan architect Rafael Viñoly, has the capacity to handle 3 million passengers a year, including a much larger parking area built for over 1200 vehicles. This new terminal building has four jetways, separate floors for arrivals and departures and a large viewing area on the top floor. The terminal has room for expansion for two additional jetways and a maximum capacity of 6 million passengers per year before the building would need actual enlargement. The new terminal was inaugurated on 5 October 2009 with official operations beginning on 29 December 2009. A new US$15 million cargo terminal was also constructed.

Regular passenger flights were suspended in mid-March 2020 due to the COVID-19 pandemic. Regular flights to Spain were resumed in July, and to São Paulo and Santiago in August.

Airlines and destinations

Passenger

Cargo

Statistics

Ground transportation
The airport is served by public transit and a private taxi service which connect to Montevideo and Punta del Este.

Other facilities
The Oficina de Investigación y Prevención de Accidentes e Incidentes de Aviación (OIPAIA) of the National Civil Aviation and Aviation Infrastructure Direction (DINACIA) has its head office on the airport property.

Accidents and incidents
18 September 1957: a Real Transportes Aéreos Convair 440-62 registration PP-AQE belonging to Transportes Aéreos Nacional, flying from Porto Alegre to Montevideo had an accident during touch down operations in Montevideo. While on a night landing procedure under fog, the aircraft undershot the runway by 1,030m, causing the left and middle gear to hit an earth bank bordering a highway. The right wing touched the ground and further on the aircraft lost both propellers. The right wing then broke off. One crew member died.
6 June 2012: an Air Class Líneas Aéreas Fairchild SA227AC Metro III, registered CX-LAS, performing a freight flight on behalf of DHL from Montevideo to Buenos Aires disappeared south of Isla de Flores.

General Cesáreo Berisso Air Base
The General Cesareo Berisso Air Base is a base of the Uruguayan Air Force. It shares runways with the Carrasco International Airport. Most of its facilities are located just east of the old civilian terminal. It is named in honor of Cesáreo L. Berisso, a pioneer of Uruguayan aviation.

Air Brigade I

Air Brigade I, one of the three brigades of the Uruguayan Air Force, is stationed at the base. It was created as Aeronáutica n.º 1 in April 1936, when it was assigned 8 Potez 25 fighter aircraft.

Air Brigade I comprises three units:
The Central Office of Assistance and the Carrasco Rescue Coordination Center.
No. 3 Squadron (Transportation)
No. 5 Squadron (Helicopters)

No. 3 Squadron (Transportation)
No. 3 Squadron operates 4 aircraft types:
 Lockheed C-130 Hercules - Military transport (2)
 Embraer C-95 Bandeirante - Light military transport (3)
 Embraer EMB 120 Brasilia - Short distance VIP transport (1)
 CASA C-212 Aviocar - Tactical transport (4)

No.5 Squadron (Helicopters)
No.5 Squadron operates 3 helicopter types:
 UH-1H Iroquois - Utility (6)
 Bell 212 - Utility (2)
 AS-365 Dauphin - VIP transport (1)

Aeronautical Museum Cnel. Jaime Meregalli
Also on the base is the Cnel. Jaime Meregalli Aeronautical Museum, with a hangar for static aircraft display, in addition to a building that exhibits aviation historical material.

See also

Transport in Uruguay
Punta del Este International Airport
List of airports in Uruguay

References

External links

Tour Virtual 360 Aeropuerto de Carrasco
INE map of Colonia Nicolich, Paso Carrasco, Carrasco International Airport, and parts of the municipality of Ciudad de la Costa

Airports in Uruguay
Airports established in 1947
Buildings and structures in Canelones Department
Transport in Montevideo
Ciudad de la Costa
Rafael Viñoly buildings
Uruguayan Air Force bases
Airfields of the United States Army Air Forces Air Transport Command in South America
1947 establishments in Uruguay